Aljhon Andres "Jon" Lucas (born August 18, 1995) is a Filipino actor. He is a part of ABS-CBN's Star Magic Circle 2013 and is best known for playing Dominic Zaragosa on the television drama Got to Believe. In June 2019, he transferred to GMA Network.

Filmography

Television

Movies

References

External links
 Jon Lucas' profile on Star Magic
 Jon Lucas' profile on GMA Artist Center

1995 births
Living people
Filipino male television actors
Members of Iglesia ni Cristo
Star Magic
ABS-CBN personalities
GMA Network personalities
Place of birth missing (living people)